Staphylococcus cohnii is a Gram-positive, coagulase-negative member of the bacterial genus Staphylococcus consisting of clustered cocci.  The species commonly lives on human skin; clinical isolates have shown high levels of antibiotic resistance. A strain of S. cohnii was found to contain a mobile genetic element very similar to the staphylococcal cassette chromosome encoding methicillin resistance element seen in Staphylococcus aureus.

References

Further reading

External links
Type strain of Staphylococcus cohnii at BacDive -  the Bacterial Diversity Metadatabase

cohnii